American Top Team (ATT) is one of the primary teams in mixed martial arts. The gym was founded by Dan Lambert, who brought in former members of Brazilian Top Team Marcus "Conan" Silveira, Marcelo Silveira and Ricardo Liborio, but there is no formal affiliation between the two teams.  ATT's main academy is in Coconut Creek, Florida, and there are affiliated academies throughout the United States.  ATT features professional fighters who have competed in many major promotions, such as the Ultimate Fighting Championship (UFC), PRIDE Fighting Championships, DREAM, K-1, Strikeforce, Bellator, Professional Fighters League (PFL) and ONE Championship.

In 2017, ATT also became involved in professional wrestling, and its fighters appeared as part of the American Top Team stable in events of Impact Wrestling, Major League Wrestling and All Elite Wrestling.

History 
American Top Team traces its lineage to Carlson Gracie. He was an influential Brazilian jiu-jitsu instructor, as he and his students created various innovative techniques and strategies, and favored a style of jiu-jitsu that encouraged physical prowess and aggressiveness. He was also an MMA pioneer, having fought several Vale Tudo bouts and creating one of the first academies with a specialized MMA program. In 2000, after disagreements and disputes, some of his students left him to found Brazilian Top Team (BTT) in Rio de Janeiro, Brazil. The academy was established with the objective of creating a world-class Brazilian jiu-jitsu gym and to train in the nascent sport of Mixed martial arts. By the early 2000s, BTT became one of the top academies in the world.

Dan Lambert founded American Top Team in 2001. He became friends with Florida-based BJJ instructor and MMA fighter Marcus "Conan" Silveira and both were soon joined by Marcelo Silveira and Ricardo Libório, one of the co-founders of Brazilian Top Team. All the three Brazilian masters were former BTT and Carlson Gracie black belts. Their vision was to build a world class training facility where MMA fighters could get all of their training under one roof, similar to the Brazilian Top Team. Although they shared founders and similar names, the ATT was not going to be the American branch of the BTT, but a new camp entirely. A businessman by trade and Brazilian jiu-jitsu enthusiast, Lambert oversaw American Top Team as it became one of the top MMA training facilities and martial arts academies in the world. Headquartered in Coconut Creek, Florida, American Top Team has produced numerous MMA world champions and highly notable competitors.  It is widely considered one of the top MMA facilities in the world, and it won the Best Gym category at the World MMA Awards in 2016, 2017, 2018 and 2019. There are currently over 40 American Top Team affiliates worldwide representing the ATT banner.

In 2021, Lambert and American Top Team started to appear regularly for professional wrestling promotion All Elite Wrestling, allying with Ethan Page and Scorpio Sky, with UFC fighters Andrei Arlovski, Junior Dos Santos, Jorge Masvidal, and Paige VanZant, among others, making appearances. American Top Team had previously made minor appearances in Impact Wrestling in 2017 and 2018 as part of a storyline where ATT fighter and professional wrestler Bobby Lashley quit wrestling (in kayfabe) to focus on his MMA career.

Notable fighters

 Yaroslav Amosov
 Andrei Arlovski
 Junior Dos Santos
 Joanna Jędrzejczyk
 Tyron Woodley
 Omari Akhmedov
 Movsar Evloev
 Thiago Alves
 Nina Ansaroff
 Will Brooks
 Mike Brown
 Roan Carneiro
 Kayla Harrison
 Hayder Hassan
 Kyoji Horiguchi
 Jorge Masvidal
 Antonio Carlos Junior
 Bobby Lashley
 Marcus "Buchecha" Almeida
 Bo Nickal
 Muhammed Lawal
 Douglas Lima
 Magomed Magomedkerimov
 Cole Miller
 Steve Mocco
 Jeff Monson
 Pedro Munhoz
 Dustin Poirier
 Santiago Ponzinibbio
 Yoel Romero
 Jairzinho Rozenstruik
 Alessio Sakara
 Thiago Santos
 Shahbulat Shamhalaev
 Antônio Silva
 Glover Teixeira
 Gleison Tibau
 Albert Tumenov
 Gasan Umalatov
 Jussier Formiga
 Renato Moicano
 Mateusz Gamrot
 Scott Askham
 Philipe Lins
 Adriano Moraes
 Alexandre Pantoja
 Danny Sabatello
 Juan Puerta
 Paige VanZant
 Attila Végh
 Döwletjan Ýagşymyradow
Johnny Eblen

Awards
World MMA Awards
2016 Gym of the Year
2017 Gym of the Year
2018 Gym of the Year
2019 – July 2020 Gym of the Year
2021 Gym of the Year
Voting period for 2019 awards ran from January 2019 to July 2020 due to the COVID-19 pandemic. Subsequently, the voting period for 2021 awards ran from July 2020 to July 2021.

See also
List of Top Professional MMA Training Camps

References

External links
 

2002 establishments in Florida
Mixed martial arts training facilities
Coconut Creek, Florida